Ricciarelli may refer to:

Ricciarelli, an Italian confection

People
Giulio Ricciarelli, an Italian-German actor, director, and film producer
Katia Ricciarelli, a soprano
Daniele da Volterra (Daniele Ricciarelli), a painter